Sándor Noszály can refer to:

 Sándor Noszály (high jumper), Hungarian high jumper
 Sándor Noszály (tennis), Hungarian tennis player